Best Hits Non Stop Clubmix is a remix album by Japanese singer Yōko Oginome. Released through Victor Entertainment on December 16, 1992, the album features remixes of songs mainly from Oginome's 1992 album Ryūkō Kashu.

The album peaked at No. 51 on Oricon's albums chart and sold over 15,000 copies.

Track listing 
All tracks are arranged by Yukio Sugai, Kōichi Kaminaga, and Ryujin Inoue, except where indicated.

Charts

References

External links
 

1992 remix albums
Yōko Oginome compilation albums
Japanese-language compilation albums
Victor Entertainment compilation albums